Regents School of Austin is a private, classical, non-denominational Christian school located in Austin, Texas.

Curriculum
The Regents curriculum is loosely based on a classical education model called the Trivium. The Trivium is composed of three stages: grammar, logic, and rhetoric. Grammar school comprises kindergarten through 6th grade, logic is grades 7 and 8 and rhetoric is grades 9 to 12.

In the grammar stage (K - 6) students are taught the building blocks for future subjects, including phonics, Latin, grammar, and math facts. In the logic stage (grades 7 – 8), students learn formal logic. In the final stage, rhetoric (grades 9 - 12), students learn classical rhetoric.

The school names represent their developmental approach to education.

History
Regents was founded in 1887. It originally met at Park Hills Baptist Church before moving to Tarrytown Baptist Church. Regents spent many years meeting in portable buildings in the parking lot at Tarrytown Baptist before moving to a permanent campus in 1899. Regents had its first graduating class in 1903, consisting of two students. 

The school has grown to more than 1,000 students.

Athletics
Regents offers the following athletic programs at the high-school level:

The school is part of TAPPS Division III. The 6-man football team has won five state championships within a ten-year period, the first TAPPS team to do so: in 2001, 2002, 2003 in divisions 1A and 2A, in 2006 in 4A, and again in 2010. The Knights again made the state championship game in 2011, losing to Bullard Brook Hill 26-3. In 2012 Regents moved up to TAPPS Division II and in 2016 again made the state championship game, losing to Grapevine Faith Christian 29-30 in double-overtime.

Notable people
 Terrence Rencher, basketball coach: former head coach
 Joey Wright, basketball player and coach: former basketball coach
 Lucas Hames, gay film director and LGBTQ+ activist

References

External links
 Official website

Christian schools in Texas
Education in Austin, Texas
Nondenominational Christian schools in the United States
Private K-12 schools in Texas
Classical Christian schools
1992 establishments in Texas
Educational institutions established in 1992